The Chaos After You is the third studio album by Taiwanese singer-songwriter Eric Chou, released by Sony Music Taiwan on 15 December 2017. Pre-orders for the album opened on 17 and 18 November, coinciding with his second concert tour "22 TWENTY TWO". The album marked Chou's first time as production coordinator and producer of his own work. Chou flew to Sweden to collaborate with Swedish producer Freddy Häggstam in four songs, and continued to experiment with different musical styles such as EDM. According to Chou, "every song in the album is your emotional theme, and every song has their secret story to tell." Over 100 songs were written for the album.

Track listing

References 

2017 albums
Eric Chou albums